Jarmila Kratochvílová (born 26 January 1951, in Golčův Jeníkov) is a Czech former track and field athlete. She won the 400 metres and 800 metres at the 1983 World Championships, setting a world record in the 400 m.

In 1983, she set the world record for the 800 metres, which still stands and is currently the longest-standing individual world record in athletics. Only two athletes, Pamela Jelimo of Kenya (2008), and Caster Semenya of South Africa (2018), have come within a second of Kratochvílová's mark since it was set.

Biography
In 1983, Kratochvílová broke the 800 m world record with a time of 1:53.28. At the World Championships shortly afterwards, she set a world record of 47.99 seconds to win the 400 m.

Kratochvílová's 1983 400-metre world record of 47.99 seconds stood for two years until it was broken by her great rival Marita Koch in 1985. Koch's 400-metre world record of 47.60 seconds still stands in 2023. Kratochvílová's world record on an indoor track—49.59—stood until 19 February 2023 when the 400-meter indoor world record was broken by Femke Bol from The Netherlands with a time of 49.26. Koch and Kratochvílová are the only women who have broken the 48-second barrier in a laned 400-metre outdoor race. Her 800-metre world record is the longest-standing track record in men or women's athletics, and it was described by 1996 Olympic champion Svetlana Masterkova as ".. very fast. It's impossible for women to run so fast. It will last for 100 years."

Kratochvílová was a late developer, not breaking 53 seconds for the 400 metres until she was 27, and she was 32 when she set her world records.

Allegations of drug use
Her remarkably fast times and her atypical muscular physique spawned rumors of illegal drug use. Kratochvílová has maintained her innocence, and although in 2006 the Prague newspaper Mladá fronta DNES claimed to have uncovered a doping program run by the government of Czechoslovakia, there was no link to Kratochvílová despite her being her country's highest-profile athlete. She and her coach of 20 years, Miroslav Kvac, maintain that it was rigorous training and high doses of vitamin B12 that account for her records, a claim treated with scepticism by several anti-doping campaigners. In 2017, she criticized a proposal by European Athletics to remove suspicion about drug-taking by voiding all world records set before 2005.

Post-retirement
Since her retirement, Kratochvílová has worked as an athletics coach and with the Czech national team.

References

External links

1951 births
Living people
People from Havlíčkův Brod District
Czechoslovak female sprinters
Czech female sprinters
Czechoslovak female middle-distance runners
Czech female middle-distance runners
Olympic athletes of Czechoslovakia
Olympic silver medalists for Czechoslovakia
Athletes (track and field) at the 1980 Summer Olympics
World Athletics Championships athletes for Czechoslovakia
World Athletics Championships medalists
European Athletics Championships medalists
World Athletics record holders
World record setters in athletics (track and field)
World record holders in masters athletics
Medalists at the 1980 Summer Olympics
Olympic silver medalists in athletics (track and field)
World Athletics indoor record holders
Recipients of Medal of Merit (Czech Republic)
Track & Field News Athlete of the Year winners
World Athletics Championships winners
Olympic female sprinters
Friendship Games medalists in athletics
Sportspeople from the Vysočina Region